This is the complete list of Asian Games medalists in judo from 1986 to 2018.

Men

Extra lightweight
 −60 kg: 1986–

Half lightweight
 −65 kg: 1986–1994
 −66 kg: 1998–

Lightweight
 −71 kg: 1986–1994
 −73 kg: 1998–

Half middleweight
 −78 kg: 1986–1994
 −81 kg: 1998–

Middleweight
 −86 kg: 1986–1994
 −90 kg: 1998–

Half heavyweight
 −95 kg: 1986–1994
 −100 kg: 1998–

Heavyweight
 +95 kg: 1986–1994
 +100 kg: 1998–

Openweight

Team

Women

Extra lightweight
 −48 kg: 1990–

Half lightweight
 −52 kg: 1990–

Lightweight
 −56 kg: 1990–1994
 −57 kg: 1998–

Half middleweight
 −61 kg: 1990–1994
 −63 kg: 1998–

Middleweight
 −66 kg: 1990–1994
 −70 kg: 1998–

Half heavyweight
 −72 kg: 1990–1994
 −78 kg: 1998–

Heavyweight
 +72 kg: 1990–1994
 +78 kg: 1998–

Openweight

Team

Mixed

Team

References

External links
Asian Games results at Asian Judo Federation
Medalists from previous Asian Games – Men
Medalists from previous Asian Games – Women

Judo
medalists